Hauptkanal Sterkrade is a drainage canal near Oberhausen, North Rhine-Westphalia, Germany. It discharges into the Emscher via the Handbach.

See also
List of rivers of North Rhine-Westphalia

References

Geography of North Rhine-Westphalia
Sterkrade
CHauptkanalSterkrade
Canals in Germany